Sault Ste. Marie station in Sault Ste Marie, Ontario, Canada is a railway station which acts as the terminus for the Algoma Central Railway train service.  The Algoma Central Railway is a subsidiary of Canadian National Railway. The station building and passenger platform are located in the parking lot of Station Mall.  Regular service to Hearst ended in July 2015.

References

Buildings and structures in Sault Ste. Marie, Ontario
Canadian National Railway stations in Ontario
Rail transport in Sault Ste. Marie, Ontario
Railway stations in Algoma District